Some countries share the same national anthem music, or the exact anthem entirely.

Countries that have the same national anthem music 
The following is a list of countries that have the same national anthem music, but not the same words.

Countries that have the exact same national anthem 
The following is a list of countries that have the same national anthem, word for word.

Notes

References 

National anthem
National anthems